Patikhalghata Union (Bengali:পাটিখালঘাটা ইউনিয়ন) is one of the six union councils under Kathalia Upazila of Jhalakati District in the Barishal Division of southern region of Bangladesh.

History

History of Patikhalghata Union 
There is a saying among the people that, once this area was a river char, a forest and a leafy garden. People from far and wide used to cultivate this leaf, made "Pati"  with that and sell them in the market. Later when the people started living here and started cultivating land, they named this area Patikhalghata.

Geography 
Patikhalghata Union is situated at the Kathalia Sadar of Kathalia Upazila.

Area 
Patikhalghata has an area of 4,414 acres.

Geographical Data

Canal and River  

 Halta River
 Bahar Canal
 Mistrir Canal

Cultural Features

Language  
With Linguistic Tradition and Independence the rural language of Barishal attracts people especially. In continuity the people of Patikhalghata speak the language.

Administration

Administrative Structure 
Patikhalghata Union is the 2nd Union Parishad Under Kathalia Upazila.The administrative activities of this union is under Kathalia Union Parishad. This is included in the 125 No. Electoral Area Jhalakathi-1 of National Parliament .

Administrative Areas 
At Present, there is 6 villages under Patikhalghata Union.The administrative activities of this union is under Patikhalghata Union Parishad.

Demographics 
According to Census-2011, The total population of Patikhalghata Union is 15,777.Among them number of male is 7,709 and number of female is 8,068.Number of total family is 3991.

Village-wise Population

Education 
According to the Census-2011, the literacy rate of Patikhalghata Union is about 53%.

Number of Educational Institution  

 Primary School-09
 Madrasa-07
 Non-Gov. Reg. Primary School-03
 High School-04
 Lower Secondary School-01

Transportation 
The distance from Kathalia Upazila Sadar to Patikhalghata Union Council is 9 km. People can reach Amua from Kathalia by Bus or rickshaw at first. Then they have to board on  steamer to reach directly to Patikhalghata Union Council.

Places of interest

Ashar Alo Jame Masjid

Notable personalities 
The Notable Personalities of Patikhalghata Union are:

 Dr.Sekandar Hayat Khan
 Mr.Chand Mia Molla
 Mr.Motimia Jomadder
 Chittaranjan Das

Markets 
Name of the markets are:

 Tarabunia Market

 Patikhalghata Market
 Neyamatpura Mollarhat Market
 Morichbunia Market
 Jhorkhali New Market

See also 

 Upazilas of Bangladesh
 Districts of Bangladesh
 Divisions of Bangladesh

References

External links 

Unions of Kathalia Upazila
Jhalokati District